Tang-e Quchan or Tang Quchan may refer to:
 Tang-e Quchan, Hormozgan
 Tang-e Quchan, Kerman